Marano Lagunare is a comune (municipality) in the Province of Udine in the Italian region Friuli-Venezia Giulia, located about  northwest of Trieste and about  south of Udine.

Marano Lagunare borders the following municipalities: Carlino, Grado, Latisana, Lignano Sabbiadoro, Muzzana del Turgnano, Palazzolo dello Stella, Precenicco, San Giorgio di Nogaro.

Twin towns
Marano Lagunare is twinned with:

  Schweighouse-sur-Moder, France

References

External links
Official website

Cities and towns in Friuli-Venezia Giulia